Kevin Llewellyn Callan (born 24 March 1962), better known as Stewart Home, is an English artist, filmmaker, writer, pamphleteer, art historian, and activist. His novels include the non-narrative 69 Things to Do with a Dead Princess (2002), and the re-imagining of the 1960s in Tainted Love (2005).  Earlier parodistic pulp fictions work includes Pure Mania, Red London, No Pity, Cunt, and Defiant Pose which pastiche the work of 1970s British skinhead pulp novel writer Richard Allen and combine it with pornography, political agit-prop, and historical references to punk rock and avant-garde art.

Life and work
Home was born in South London.  His mother, Julia Callan-Thompson, was a model who was associated with the radical arts scene in Notting Hill Gate.

In the 1980s and 1990s, he exhibited art and also wrote a number of non-fiction pamphlets, magazines, and books, and edited anthologies. They chiefly reflected the politics of the radical left, punk culture, the occult, the history and influence of the Situationists – of whom he is a severe critic – and other radical left-wing 20th century anti-art avant-garde movements. In Home's earlier work, the focus of these reflections was often Neoism, a subcultural network of which he had been a member, and from which he derived various splinter projects. Typical characteristics of his activism in the 1980s and 1990s included use of group identities (such as Monty Cantsin) and collective monikers (e.g. "Karen Eliot"); overt employment of plagiarism; pranks and publicity stunts.

1970s

As a youth Home was drawn first to music and bohemianism, and then to radicalism.  He attended meetings of many different leftist groups including several organised by the Trotskyist Socialist Youth League and even two editorial meetings of Anarchy Magazine. He did not join these organisations and later repudiated them as reactionary, instead professing autonomous communist political positions after going to the London Workers Group. In the late seventies Home produced his first punk (music) fanzines, including early issues of "Down in the Street" which had run to seven numbers by the time he stopped publishing it in 1980. At the end of the seventies Home also made his first public appearances as a musician as bassist with revolutionary ska band The Molotovs. The latter group mixed covers of classic reggae numbers like 'Johnny Too Bad' with original tunes such as "Notting Hill Carnival" (about rioting) and 'Don't Envy The Boss' (the juvenile irony of the chorus ran to: "don't envy the boss, I know he's got a lot, but he really really earned the money to pay for his yacht").

1980s

From 1982 to 1984, Home operated as a one-person-movement "Generation Positive", and having already founded a punk band called White Colours (named after an experimental novel by R. D. Reeve) in 1980, he started a new group with the same name in 1982. He also published an art fanzine SMILE, the name of which was a play on the Mail Art zines FILE and VILE (which in turn parodied the graphic design of LIFE magazine). The concept was that many other bands in the world should call themselves White Colours, and many other underground periodicals should call themselves SMILE, too. Home's early SMILE magazines mostly contained art manifestos for the "Generation Positive", which in their rhetoric resembled those of 1920s Berlin Dadaist manifestos.

In April 1984, Home got in touch with the originally American subcultural artistic network of Neoism, and participated in the eighth Neoist Apartment Festival in London. Since Neoism operated with multiple identities, too, and called upon all its participants to adopt the name Monty Cantsin, Home decided to give up the "Generation Positive" in favor of Neoism, and make SMILE and White Colours part of Neoism as well. According to Florian Cramer (who didn't come into contact with Neoism until the late eighties) one year later, Home took a sleep-deprivation prank played with him at a Neoist Festival in Italy as the reason to declare his split from Neoism; Home insists he decided to break with Neoism before going to Italy. Shortly before, a conflict between him and Neoism founder Istvan Kantor had escalated and led to their alienation.

Home's SMILE no 8, which appeared in 1985, reflected the split with Neoism by proposing a "Praxis" movement to replace Neoism, with Karen Eliot as its new multiple name. This and the following three SMILE issues otherwise featured an eclectic mixture of manifesto-style writing, political reflections on radical left-wing anti-art movements from the Lettrist International, the Situationists, Fluxus, Mail Art, individuals such as Gustav Metzger and Henry Flynt, and short parodistic skinhead pulp prose in the style of his then unwritten early novels.
Many texts included in Home's SMILE issues plagiarised other, especially Situationist, writing, simply replacing terms like "spectacle" with "glamour".

At the same time Home was involved in a series of collective installations including "Ruins of Glamour" (Chisenhale Studios, London 1986), "Desire in Ruins" (Transmission Gallery, Glasgow 1987), "Refuse" (Galleriet Läderfabriken, Malmö 1988) and "Anon" (33 Arts Centre, Luton 1989) which generated serious art world interest and art publication reviews and even coverage in British newspapers such as "The Observer" and "Independent". Those Home worked closely with on these shows included Hannah Vowles and Glyn Banks (collectively known as Art in Ruins), Ed Baxter and Stefan Szczelkun.

Following on from this and drawing on 1980s American appropriation art, Home's concept of plagiarism soon developed into a proposed movement and a series of "Festivals of Plagiarism" in 1988 and 1989, which themselves plagiarised the Neoist apartment festivals and 1960s Fluxus festivals. Home combined the plagiarism campaign with a call for an Art Strike between 1990 and 1993. Unlike earlier art-strike proposals such as that of Gustav Metzger in the 1970s, it was not intended as an opportunity for artists to seize control of the means of distributing their own work, but rather as an exercise in propaganda and psychic warfare aimed at smashing the entire art world rather than just the gallery system.

The Art Strike campaign caused something of a rumpus in the contemporary London art world (Home got to talk about the Art Strike at venues such as the Institute of Contemporary Art and Victoria and Albert Museum, as well as on national BBC Radio arts programmes and London area television arts programmes), but was more seriously discussed in subcultural art networks, especially in Mail Art. Consequently, mail artists made up a reasonable proportion of the participants at the Festivals of Plagiarism, and Mail Art publications disseminated the Art Strike campaign.

In the 1980s Home was also a regular contributor to the anarcho-punk/cultural magazine VAGUE.

1990s

In 1993 Home officially resurfaced, having meanwhile gained an influence and reputation in American counter-culture comparable to writers like Hakim Bey and Kathy Acker. Aside from reassessments of his earlier engagement with Neoism, the Situationists, punk, and the plagiarism and Art Strike campaigns, and, as his source of income, the continued parodistic pulp-novel writing, Home's style had undergone some significant changes. While his late 1980s pamphleteering could be viewed as an, albeit subtly humorous, project to collect and fuse radical energies from aesthetically uncompromising extreme left-wing fringes of art and politics, Home reinvented himself in the 1990s as a cynical satirist and jester.

In the post-Art Strike years, he had for the first time publicly occupied himself with hermeticism and the occult. The Neoist Alliance, his third one-person-movement after The Generation Positive and Praxis, served simultaneously as a tactical reappropriation of the Neoism label for self-promotional purposes, and as a corporate identity for pamphlets that satirically advocated a combination of artistic avant-garde, the occult, and politics into an "avant-bard". Meanwhile, Home continued to be courted by the London art world, and in the mid-nineties in particular he was championed by the young and very fashionable artist-curator Matthew Higgs (who at that time was also playing a significant role in propelling future Turner Prize winners Jeremy Deller and Martin Creed into the public eye).

Higgs included Home in group shows he curated – such as "Imprint 93" at City Racing (London June–July 95), "Multiple Choice" at Cubitt Gallery (London March–April 96) and "A to Z" at Approach Gallery (London 1998) – as well issuing a pamphlet and later a badge by Home as part of his prestigious edition of Imprint 93 multiples. At this time uber curator Hans Ulrich Obrist also included Home in his survey of young British art "Life/Live" Musée d’art Moderne de la Ville de Paris (October 96- January 97, subsequently toured). In the mid-nineties Home was also appearing regularly as a live artist at "Disobey" events organised by Paul Smith and featuring music from the likes of techno acts Panasonic and Aphex Twin.

2000s

Aware of the marked decline in countercultural activities throughout the urban centres in which he operated, Home shifted gear in this area of his work in the new millennium, upping his level of Internet activities; web work had been only a minor part of his repertoire in the 1990s. Aside from running his own website, Home is a dedicated blogger and had six separate MySpace profiles (as well as having active accounts with other social networking sites such as Twitter, YouTube, Flickr and Facebook). However, given Home's extrovert personality, he maintains a taste for live appearances and in 2007 began performing ventriloquism in public.

This activity was preceded by Internet ventriloquism using two MySpace profiles as Mister Trippy and a ventriloquist doll called Tessie (who often claimed to be pregnant and became very angry when Home suggested dolls can't become pregnant). Home's novels in this period no longer incorporated subcultural elements and instead focused on issues of form and aesthetics: 69 Things to Do with a Dead Princess contains capsule reviews of dozens of obscure books as well as elaborate descriptions of stone circles, while in Down and Out in Shoreditch & Hoxton every paragraph is exactly 100 words long. At times in this period Home's film making also became radically non-representational, and rarely required any original cinematography whatsoever; for example his 2002 fiftieth anniversary English language colour re-make of Guy Debord's "Screams in Favour of De Sade", and 2004 "Eclipse & Re-Emergence of the Oedipus Complex", the latter consists solely of still photographs of his mother with a narration scripted by Home but delivered by Australian actress Alice Parkinson.

This tendency towards abstraction was already evident in some of Home's work of the 1990s, particularly sound pieces such as the cut up radio play "Divvy", but in the 2000s it became increasingly central to his output. This ran parallel to Home's increasing acceptance by various sections of the high brow art world, evidenced for example by the fact that in 2006 he produced an exhibition entitled "Hallucination Generation" at the prestigious Arnolfini in Bristol, won a major Arts Council/BBC commission "London Art Tripping" and he was editor of the Semina series for art book publisher Book Works in London (2007–2010); as well as being writer-in-residence at the Tate Modern in London (2007/08). However, Home combines these activities with a critique of the institution of art.

Neoist Alliance
The Neoist Alliance was a moniker used by Home between 1994 and 1999 for his mock-occult psychogeographical activities. According to Home, the alliance was an occult order with himself as the magus and only member. The manifesto called for "debasement in the arts" and in a parodic manner plagiarized a 1930s British fascist pamphlet on cultural politics. Alliance activities mainly consisted of the publication of a newsletter "Re-action" which appeared in ten issues.

In 1993, the Neoist Alliance staged a prank against a concert by composer Karlheinz Stockhausen in Brighton by announcing its intention to levitate the concert hall by magical means during the concert. This was an homage to the 1965 anti-art picketing of a Stockhausen concert in New York by Fluxus members Henry Flynt and George Maciunas.

Alliance activities ran parallel and were closely related to those of the revived London Psychogeographical Association and the Italian-based Luther Blissett project.

Despite its name, the Neoist Alliance had no affiliation with the international Neoist network which had been active since 1980. Stewart Home had previously become a member and activist of that network in 1984, but renounced it one year later and subsequently worked under the collective monikers of "Praxis", later "plagiarism" and the Art Strike movement.

Books
Home's first books, which appeared between 1988 and 1995, are essentially an outgrowth and elaboration of his earlier SMILE writings, though without their fragmentary-aphoristic character and eclectic mix of genres. The Assault on Culture, written when Home was twenty-five, is an underground art history sketching Home's ultimately personal history of ideas and influences in post-World War II fringe radical art and political currents, and including – for the first time in a book – a tactically manipulated history of post-war culture to make it conclude with Neoism (and which it is sometimes claimed includes character assassinations of individual Neoists) that was continued in the later book Neoism, Plagiarism and Praxis.

Despite its highly personal perspective and agenda, The Assault on Culture: Utopian currents from Lettrisme to Class War (Aporia Press and Unpopular Books, London, 1988) is considered a useful art-history work, providing an introduction to a range of cultural currents which had, at that time at least, been under-documented. The work has, however, been highly criticised for deficiencies in its view of utopian currents, including its personal biases, by such writers as Bob Black. Like Home's other publications of that time, it played an influential part in renewing interest in the Situationist International.

Pure Mania, Home's first novel from 1989, took the recipe of the Richard Allen parodies from SMILE  and turned them into a recipe for much of his subsequent novel writing of the 1990s (there are exceptions such as the non-linear "Come Before Christ & Murder Love"). The book Neoist Manifestos/The Art Strike Papers featured, on its first part, abridged versions of Home's manifesto-style writings from SMILE, and a compilation of writings and reactions regarding the Art Strike from various authors and sources, mainly Mail Art publications.

His 1995 novel Slow Death fictionalises and ridicules this process of the historification of Neoism (including the planting of archives at the National Art Library in the Victoria and Albert Museum; this recently became reality when Home sold the V&A his own archive documenting twenty years of his art and underground activities including those involving Neoism) as if to give his own game away but, typically with Home, as soon as one agenda has, apparently, been exposed, whether Home's own or one at large, the game moves on so that he constantly forces readers into a position of 'Should I believe any of this?'.

Home's novel Cunt was rejected by several publishers before being published by Do-Not Press in 1999. Its plot, which satirises travel writing, the picaresque novel and the publishing industry, centres on David Kelso, an author attempting to write a trilogy recounting his sexual experiences. Confusion Incorporated: A Collection of Lies, Hoaxes and Hidden Truths, published in the same year, is a collection of fictional interviews, reviews and essays. A third 1999 publication, the pamphlet Repetitions: A Collection of Proletarian Pleasures Ranging from Rodent Worship to Ethical Relativism Appended with a Critique of Unicursal Reason, consists of letters, prefaces and introductions.

With the publication of his novel 69 Things to Do with a Dead Princess (Canongate, Edinburgh 2002), Home finally got the British literary press sitting up and taking serious notice of him, ironically for a book which carries his most acidic condemnations of the literary establishment. Home's skinhead looks and attitude on official photographs of the mid-nineties are merely publicity poses, and recently he has been much more inclined to appear nude in publicity material (this started after Home consented to appear in a nude celebrity feature for a Finnish newspaper in 2004); and this nudity is something that offends just as much as Home's earlier faked 'hard man' looks.

Repression in Russia

Alex Kervey of T-ough Press, publishers of the Russian edition of Come Before Christ and Murder Love has reported repression of the book as "pornography and insulting Christian values". Kervey says this is happening in the context of a campaign run by such far-right groups as the National Bolsheviks against Home, which has included arson attacks against T-ough Press alongside state censorship.

Bibliography

Novels
 Pure Mania (Polygon, Edinburgh 1989. Finnish translation Like, Helsinki 1994. German translation Nautilus, Hamburg 1994).
 Defiant Pose (Peter Owen, London 1991. Finnish translation Like, Helsinki 1995. German translation, Nautilus, Hamburg 1995). Some of the action of this novel takes place on the Samuda Estate
 Red London (AK Press, London & Edinburgh 1994, ; Finnish translation Like, Helsinki 1995).
 Slow Death (Serpent's Tail, London 1996. Finnish translation Like, Helsinki 1996) 
 Blow Job (Serpent's Tail, London 1997. Finnish translation, Like, Helsinki 1996. Greek translation Oxys Publishing, Athens 1999. German translation, Nautilus, Hamburg, 2001).
 Come Before Christ and Murder Love (Serpent's Tail, London 1997).
 Cunt (Do-Not Press, London 1999) 
 Whips & Furs: My Life as a bon-vivant, gambler & love rat by Jesus H. Christ (Attack! Books, London 2000).
 69 Things to Do with a Dead Princess (Canongate, Edinburgh, 2002) 
 Down and Out in Shoreditch and Hoxton (Do-Not Press, London 2004).
 Tainted Love (Virgin Books, London 2005).
 Memphis Underground (Snowbooks, London 2007).
 Blood Rites of the Bourgeoisie (BookWorks, London 2010).
 Mandy, Charlie & Mary-Jane (Penny-Ante Editions, 2013).
 The 9 Lives of Ray The Cat Jones (Test Centre, 2014).
 She's My Witch (London Books, 2020).
 Art School Orgy (New Reality Records, Loughborough 2023)

Stories
 No Pity (AK Press, London & Edinburgh 1993, ; Finnish translation Like, Helsinki 1997).

Poetry

 SEND CA$H (Morbid Books, London 2018).

Non-fiction
 The Assault on Culture: Utopian currents from Lettrisme to Class War (Aporia Press and Unpopular Books, London, 1988)  (New edition AK Press, Edinburgh 1991. Polish translation, Wydawnictwo Signum, Warsaw 1993. Italian translation AAA edizioni, Bertiolo 1996. Portuguese translation, Conrad Livros, Brazil 1999. Spanish translation, Virus Editorial, 2002. Russian translation, Asebeia, 2020).
 Neoist Manifestos (AK Press, Edinburgh 1991).
 Cranked up Really High: Genre Theory And Punk Rock (Codex, Hove 1995, new edition 1997. Italian translation Castelvecchi, Rome 1996) (an 'inside account' of the history of punk rock).
Conspiracies, Cover-Ups and Diversions: A Collection of Lies, Hoaxes and Hidden Truths (Sabotage Editions, London 1995).
 Green Apocalypse (a critique of the magazine and organisation Green Anarchist) with Luther Blissett (Unpopular Books, London 1995).
Analecta (Sabotage Editions, London 1996).
 Neoism, Plagiarism and Praxis (AK Press, London, Edinburgh 1995. Italian translation Costa & Nolan Genoa 1997).
 The House of Nine Squares: Letters on Neoism, Psychogeography And Epistemological Trepidation, with Florian Cramer (Invisible Books London 1997).
Disputations on Art, Anarchy and Assholism (Sabotage Editions, London 1997).
Out-Takes (Sabotage Editions, London 1998).
 Confusion Incorporated: A Collection of Lies, Hoaxes & Hidden Truths (Codex, Hove 1999).
Repetitions: A Collection of Proletarian Pleasures Ranging from Rodent Worship to Ethical Relativism Appended with a Critique of Unicursal Reason (Sabotage Editions, London 1999).
Anamorphosis: Stewart Home, Searchlight and the plot to destroy civilization (Sabotage Editions, London 2000).
Jean Baudrillard and the Psychogeography of Nudism (Sabotage Editions, London 2001).
Fasting on SPAM and Other Non-aligned Diets for Our Electronic Age (Sabotage Editions, London 2002).
The Intelligent Person's Guide to Changing a Lightbulb (Sabotage Editions, London 2005).
The Correct Way to Boil Water (Sabotage Editions, London 2005).
The Easy Way to Falsify Your Credit Rating (Sabotage Editions, London 2005).
Re-Enter The Dragon: Genre Theory, Brucesploitation & the Sleazy Joys of Lowbrow Cinema (Ledatape Organisation, Melbourne 2018).

As editor

Festival of Plagiarism Ed., (Sabotage Editions, London, 1989)
Art Strike Handbook Ed., (Sabotage Editions, London, 1989)
 What is Situationism? A Reader Ed., (AK Press Edinburgh and San Francisco, 1996)  .
 Mind Invaders: A Reader in Psychic Warfare, Cultural Sabotage And Semiotic Terrorism Ed. (Serpent's Tail London, 1997).
 Suspect Device: Hard-Edged Fiction (Serpent's Tail, London 1998).
 Denizen of the Dead: The Horrors of Clarendon Court (Cripplegate Books, London 2020).

Spoken word and releases
 Comes in Your Face (Sabotage, London 1998).
 Cyber-Sadism Live! (Sabotage, London 1998).
 Pure Mania (King Mob, London 1998).
 Marx, Christ & Satan United in Struggle (Molotov Records 1999).
 Proletarian Post-Modernism (Test Centre 2013).

Funded Internet projects
NATURAL SELECTION (1998 organised by Graham Harwood & Matt Fuller, funded by the Arts Council).
TORK RADIO (1998 organised by Cambridge Junction, funded with lottery money).

Exhibitions
 Humanity in Ruins, Central Space (London, February/March 1988).
 Vermeer II, workfortheeyetodo (London July to September 1996).
 Becoming (M)other, Artspace (London December 2004 to January 2005).
 In Transition Russia, NCCA (Moscow, November/December 2008).
 Hallucination Generation: High Modernism in a Tripped Out World, Arnolfini (Bristol April to May 2006).
 Again, A Time Machine at White Columns (New York October/November 2011).
 Part of Again, A Time Machine: a Book Works touring exhibition in six parts, SPACE (London April to May 2012).
 Tilt, Building F (London November 2013).
 The Age of Anti-Ageing, The Function Room (London October/November 2014).
 Re-Enter The Dragon, Queens Park Railway Club (Glasgow, April 2016).
 Dual Flying Kicks, 5 Years (London, June 2018).
 Sexus Maleficarum, Darling Pearls & Co (London September 2020 – January 2021).

Selected film and videos

Ut Pictura Poesis (1997, 35 mm, part of project organised by Cambridge Junction with Arts Council funding).
Screams in Favour of De Sade (2002 60 mins).
Has The Litigation Already Started? (2002 70 mins).
The Golem (2002 84 mins).
Eclipse & Re-Emergence of the Oedipus Complex (2004 41 mins).
Oxum: Goddess of Love (2007 30 mins).
Re-Enter The Dragon (2016 41 mins).
Bondage As Theme & Technique (2019, 40 minutes).

See also
Anti-art
Art manifesto
3:AM Magazine

References

External links
Stewart Home Society
3:AM Magazine interview (2002)
Face feature (2000)

Historians of anarchism
1962 births
Living people
Psychogeographers
Punk writers
English art critics
20th-century English novelists
21st-century English novelists
English contemporary artists
English art historians
English male novelists
20th-century English male writers
21st-century English male writers
English male non-fiction writers
Alumni of Kingston University